Ağdamkənd is a village in the Agdam District of Azerbaijan.

History 
The village was located in the Armenian-occupied territories surrounding Nagorno-Karabakh, coming under the occupation of ethnic Armenian forces during the First Nagorno-Karabakh War.

The town subsequently was declared part of the self-proclaimed Republic of Artsakh as part of its Martakert Province.

It was returned to Azerbaijan as part of the 2020 Nagorno-Karabakh ceasefire agreement.

References 

Populated places in Aghdam District